Benton Township is a township in Atchison County, Kansas, United States. As of the 2010 census, its population was 1,014.

Geography
According to the USGS, it contains four cemeteries: Maple Grove, Monrovia, Neill and Pleasant Grove.

The stream of North Fork Stranger Creek runs through this township.

References
 USGS Geographic Names Information System (GNIS)

External links
 US-Counties.com
 City-Data.com

Townships in Atchison County, Kansas
Townships in Kansas